North Valleys High School is located in north Reno, Nevada. NVHS belongs to the Washoe County School District. It was built in 2001 and currently has a student body of roughly 2,250 students.  North Valleys competes in the Northern Nevada 3A Region for athletics.

North Valleys High School Theatre
The North Valleys Theatre Program is represented by Troupe #6880, and has had many students win competition at a state, and even national level. It is currently directed by Bradford Ka'ai'ai.

Junior Reserve Officers' Training Corps

NV-20012 is a United States Air Force Junior Reserve Officer Training Corp In Reno Nevada.
It operates inside North Valleys High School as an elective class. There are approximately 180 cadets in the Corp divided into 6 flights.

Unit history
NV-20012 received its activation orders from Air Force Headquarters, on March 26, 2001. The Corps is run by cadets and instructors: Senior aerospace science instructor (SASI) or aerospace science instructor (ASI).

Notable alumni
 Scott Cousins, Current MLB player (Miami Marlins)

References

External links 
 Official site

 
High schools in Reno, Nevada
Educational institutions established in 2001
2001 establishments in Nevada
Washoe County School District
Public high schools in Nevada